"PreGomesh", is a 2012 song by Armenian singer Sirusho. It was released on December 10, 2012 as a single.

Background 
  On December 9, 2012 Sirusho wrote on her Facebook page that the song was influenced by Lorva gutanerg (Լոռվա գութաներգ) by Komitas and posted a link to it, adding that "it will be first heard on December 10th and is called "PreGomesh". After the music video was released, she posted a status, "Life gives us opportunities of inspiration at every step, it only takes a little to notice them."

Music video
The  video, directed by Jor Meloyan, music by Sirusho, was captured in Armenia. The  video begins in St. George Church in the village of Mughni. There are also scenes in the open air and in a studio. Armenian folk elements are used in the video, including the modernized version of taraz.

Song meaning
Pregomesh: Gomesh (Armenian: գոմեշ) means Buffalo, and Pre (Armenian: պռե), as well as the Ar-ha and the Pre-re, are the sounds made by herders to guide and move the water buffalo (gomesh). The r in Pre is a heavy, rolling 'r' sound. In Pregomesh the animal represents the human that is strong, honest, and does not give up.

Criticism 
Although the song received mostly positive reviews, 
gusan Haykazun, director of the folk ensemble Haykazunk criticized Sirusho for modifying  Komitas's song, saying that "if one wants to be seen, one can simply  perform it as it is." Then he continued, "Sirusho didn't have the right to do such a thing." Sirusho responded to this statement by saying that she didn't modify Komitas's song, but was influenced by it.

Pregomesh Accessories
Inspired by the song, Sirusho created Pregomesh Accessories line. Sirusho restored the old Armenian cultural values and aimed at making the world know more about Armenian culture. Sirusho is the founder of the company, involved in designing samples and giving a modern touch to the old ornaments and items.

Awards

References

Armenian-language songs
Armenian songs
2012 singles
2012 songs
Songs written by Avet Barseghyan